Events in the year 1937 in Portugal.

Incumbents
President: Óscar Carmona
Prime Minister: António de Oliveira Salazar

Events

Arts and entertainment

Sports
A.A. Avanca founded
G.D. Fabril founded
Mem Martins Sport Clube founded
UD Sousense founded

Births

1 September – Francisco Pinto Balsemão, businessman, journalist and politician.
7 December - Ary dos Santos, poet, songwriter (died 1984)

Deaths

References

 
1930s in Portugal
Portugal
Years of the 20th century in Portugal
Portugal